Alexei Beletski (also Alexei Beletsky; born 22 May 1979) is an Israeli former competitive ice dancer. With his wife Natalia Gudina, he placed as high as 14th at the World Championships, as high as 9th at the European Championships, and competed at the Winter Olympics.

Gudina and Beletski married in 1999. They competed together for Ukraine until the end of 1998/1999 season, after which they switched to competing for Israel. Gudina and Beletski the 2000–05 Israeli national silver medalists. They placed 19th at the 2002 Winter Olympics.

Programs 
(with Gudina)

Competitive highlights 
(with Gudina)

References

External links

 
Care to Ice Dance: Gudina & Beletski

1979 births
Ukrainian male ice dancers
Israeli male ice dancers
Ukrainian people of Israeli descent
Figure skaters at the 2002 Winter Olympics
Olympic figure skaters of Israel
Sportspeople from Odesa
Living people